Jaclyn Nesheiwat Stapp (born July 29, 1980) is a beauty queen, author, philanthropist, actress, and fashion model with pageant roots in Florida and New York. She is married to Scott Stapp, the voice of the band Creed and current solo touring artist.  Her most notable titles include Mrs. Florida America 2008, Miss New York USA 2004, and First Runner-Up for Mrs. World 2022. In 2010 she wrote a children's book, Wacky Jacky: The True Story of an Unlikely Beauty Queen.  She is executive director of The Scott Stapp With Arms Wide Open Foundation, and founder of CHARM (Children Are Magical) by Jaclyn Stapp, which was formed to raise awareness of issues with which children deal and to provide underprivileged youth help with education.

Pageants
In 1995, Stapp entered the pageant for Miss Florida Teen 1995. She entered the pageant system again seven years later with the Miss Florida USA 2001 where she placed third runner-up. The following year she competed for the second time and was first runner-up to Shannon Ford.

Having moved to New York, Nesheiwat competed in the Miss New York USA pageant in 2003, where she won the 2004 title. During her reign, Stapp was invited by the White House Provisional Coalition Authority in March 2004 to visit U.S. troops in Iraq including her sister Army Capt. Julia Nesheiwat (then serving in Baghdad, later the US Homeland Security Advisor).
Stapp represented New York in the Miss USA 2004 pageant broadcast live from the Kodak Theatre in Hollywood, California in April 2004. On May 31, 2008, Stapp won the Mrs. Florida America pageant, and was named Mrs. America 2008 First-Runner Up and awarded the title of Most Photogenic. In 2011, she represented the country of Jordan at Mrs. World, where she placed in the Top 5. In 2022, she was First-Runner Up in that Mrs. World pageant and was winner of the Congeniality Award.

Magazine covers
Stork 
PBG Lifestyle 
Boca Life Magazine

Acting
Stapp's acting credits include episodes of Full House, Second Noah, and Sex and the City.

Personal life
Stapp is of Jordanian descent, one of five children raised in Umatilla, Florida. After graduating from Umatilla High School in 1998, she attended Stetson University and received a Bachelor of Arts degree in Marketing and 
Communications in 2002. She is the sister of Julia Nesheiwat and Janette Nesheiwat, MD, a board-certified family and emergency physician.  Stapp married Scott Stapp at Viscaya Gardens, Florida in 2006. The two met during her reign as Miss New York USA at a Muscular Dystrophy charity gala in New York in January 2005. The couple have three children.

Bibliography
Wacky Jacky: The True Story of an Unlikely Beauty Queen. TriMark Press (2010).

References

Living people
Miss USA 2004 delegates
1980 births
Stetson University alumni
Mrs. America (contest) delegates
American people of Jordanian descent
People from Carmel, New York
People from Umatilla, Florida